Gabriel N'Galula Mbuyi (born 1 June 1982), sometimes referred to as Junior, is a former Belgian footballer.

Career
Junior began his career at Anderlecht where he showed promise in his 28 games, but a long injury saw him lose his place to Yves Vanderhaeghe and Besnik Hasi. In the 2004–05 season, he was loaned to Mons, where he played 15 times as Mons suffered relegation to the Second Division at the end of the season. He was loaned again to Stoke City in England for the 2005–06 season where former Anderlect manager Johan Boskamp had been appointed manager. He played 24 matches for Stoke and left at the end of the season along with Boskamp.

Boskamp was made Standard Liège manager and he signed Junior on a permanent deal with as part of the Mohammed Tchité transfer to Anderlecht in the 2006–07 season. He played one match for Standard, in a UEFA Cup qualification match. He spent the 2007–08 season, with K.S.V. Roeselare before deciding to retire from professional football and pursue a different career.

In 2013, he began working at BX Brussels as a sporting director.

Personal life
His brother Floribert N'Galula is also a professional footballer.

Career statistics

References

1982 births
Belgian footballers
Footballers from Kinshasa
Democratic Republic of the Congo emigrants to Belgium
Association football midfielders
K.S.V. Roeselare players
Living people
Standard Liège players
R.A.E.C. Mons players
R.S.C. Anderlecht players
Stoke City F.C. players
English Football League players
Belgian Pro League players